The ANF Les Mureaux 120 was a 1930s French three-seat military night reconnaissance monoplane built by ANF Les Mureaux.

Design and development
The 120 was designed to meet a 1928 French Aéronautique Militaire requirement for a three-seat night reconnaissance aircraft. The 120 was a high-wing monoplane powered by two  Lorraine Algol engines. The prototype was first flown in 1931 and was followed by a second aircraft, designated ANF Les Mureaux 121, powered by  Gnome-Rhône 7Kb engines. The aircraft failed to gain any interest from the French military and did not enter production.

Variants
120
Initial prototype of the night reconnaissance aircraft powered by 2 x  Lorraine Algol engines
121
Second prototype powered by 2 x  Gnome-Rhône 7Kb engines

Specifications (121 second prototype)

References

Notes

Bibliography

1930s French military reconnaissance aircraft
120
Cancelled military aircraft projects of France
High-wing aircraft
Aircraft first flown in 1931
Twin piston-engined tractor aircraft